Komola Umarova (born 23 October 1999) is an Uzbekistani female tennis player.

Umarova has a career high WTA singles ranking of 762, achieved on 30 January 2017. Umarova also has a career high WTA doubles ranking of 738 achieved on 17 July 2017.

Umarova made her WTA main draw debut at the 2016 Tashkent Open, where she lost to Nao Hibino in the first round.

Playing for Uzbekistan in Fed Cup, she has a career W/L record of 1–0.

Umarova is currently studying at Florida International University, where she plays tennis for the Panthers.

External links

1999 births
Living people
Uzbekistani female tennis players
FIU Panthers women's tennis players
21st-century Uzbekistani women